The 19015/19016 Saurashtra Express is an express train belonging to Indian Railways that runs between  and  in India.

It operates as train number 19015 from Mumbai Central to Porbandar and as train number 19016 in the reverse direction. It is named after Saurashtra region of Gujarat

On, 1 January 2018 the train number of Saurashtra Express was changed from 19215 / 19216 to 19015 / 19016.

Coaches

The 19015/19016 Saurashtra Express presently has 3 AC 3 tier, 7 Sleeper Class, 4 General Unreserved & 2 seating cum luggage rake coaches. It also carries a Railway Mail Service Coach & a Milk Coach.

As with most train services in India, coach composition may be amended at the discretion of Indian Railways depending on demand.

Service

The 19015 Saurashtra Express covers the distance of 955 kilometres in 20 hours 10 mins (44.42 km/hr) & in 22 hours 10 mins (43.08 km/hr) as 19016 Saurashtra Express.

As the average speed of the train is below 55 km/hr, as per Indian Railways rules, its fare does not include a Superfast surcharge.

Route

Schedule

Traction

Prior to Western Railways switching to AC system, the Saurashtra Express would be hauled by a WCAM-1 engine until  after which a Vatva-based WDM-3A would take over.

As Western Railways switched over to AC system on 5 February 2012, it is now hauled by a WAP-4 engine from the Vatva or Electric Loco Shed, Valsad until  after which a Vatva-based WDM-3A takes over.

External links

References 

Named passenger trains of India
Rail transport in Maharashtra
Rail transport in Gujarat
Transport in Porbandar
Transport in Mumbai
Express trains in India